Uqsha Mach'ay (local Quechua uqsha (uqsa) a high altitude grass, Quechua mach'ay cave, also spelled Ocshamachay) is a mountain in the Andes of Peru which reaches a height of approximately . It is located in the Junín Region, Jauja Province, on the border of the districts of Apata and Molinos.

References 

Mountains of Peru
Mountains of Junín Region